BBC Kids was a Canadian specialty television channel carrying programming for children and teenagers. It was a joint venture between Knowledge West Communications, which managed the network and held the majority 80% interest and was a subsidiary of Knowledge Network, with BBC Studios licensing the BBC brand and holding the remaining 20% in the JV. Originally an ad-supported network, it transitioned to non-commercial operation when it was transferred to Knowledge.

History

Launch
In November 2000, Alliance Atlantis was granted approval by the Canadian Radio-television and Telecommunications Commission (CRTC) to launch BBC Kids, described as "a national English language Category 2 (what is the current category B) specialty television service devoted to top-quality educational and entertaining programming for children and youth (ages 2-17). It will feature programming primarily from the UK and around the world. 65% of the programming will target children ages 2 to 11, the majority of which will target 6 to 11 years old and 35% will target youth ages 12 to 17."

The channel launched on November 5, 2001 as a joint venture between Alliance Atlantis and BBC Worldwide, the BBC's overseas operating arm. As was its remit, it primarily sourced its programming from networks and producers from the United Kingdom, though its programming sources were never exclusively limited to those of the BBC. This also included international co-productions, including Tots TV, Mr. Bean: The Animated Series, and The Sleepover Club. It also broadcast a small amount of Canadian and Anglo-Canadian co-productions (including previously-produced Alliance Atlantis programming co-produced with an American network such as PBS, Disney Channel, or Nickelodeon for American broadcast) to meet CRTC Canadian content regulations and quotas.

Transition from Alliance Atlantis to Knowledge Network
On January 18, 2008, a joint venture between Canwest and Goldman Sachs Capital Partners known as CW Media, acquired control of BBC Kids through its purchase of Alliance Atlantis' broadcasting assets, which were placed in a trust in August 2007. It then became a part of Shaw Communications on October 10, 2010 after it acquired Canwest outright with the GSCP stake in CW Media..

Shaw's ownership would be short-lived due to regulatory requirements to sell some former CW Media assets, and that process started on December 22, 2010 with early due diligence with a then-undisclosed sales partner. On January 17, 2011, Knowledge Network Corporation, a Crown corporation of the Government of British Columbia, announced it had finalized an agreement to purchase the channel through a subsidiary called Knowledge-West Communications Corporation from Shaw Media. BBC Worldwide would retain its existing interest. The sale was completed on April 29, 2011, and with it and CRTC approval, it converted from a commercial network to a non-commercial service, while relocating operations from Toronto to Burnaby in suburban Vancouver.

The transaction resulted in a decision by cable providers in The Bahamas and Jamaica (which generally import Canadian channels onto their services for the convenience of snowbirds visiting the West Indies) to drop the network at the end of 2011.

Closure
On October 2, 2018, a joint statement from Knowledge Network and BBC announced the channel would cease operations at the stroke of midnight on December 31, 2018. Though there was no reasoning for the closure stated originally, then-Knowledge chief Rudy Buttignol subsequently cited the end of the CRTC's traditional protection of small and independent networks to allow for broader discretionary services without any programming restrictions. Knowledge continues to carry programming from the BBC, and CBBC/CBeebies programming as a part of Knowledge Kids, including programming from BBC Kids merged onto the Knowledge schedule. On January 10, 2019, the CRTC revoked the channel's license at the request of Knowledge.

Programming

The Spot 

 2gether: The Series
 3 Non Blondes
 90 Days in Hollywood
 4 O'Clock Club
 Ace Lightning (2003-2010)
 The Adventures of Paddington Bear
 The Adventures of Sam & Max: Freelance Police
 Absolutely Fabulous
 Albie (2002-2004)
 All About Animals
 Anatole (2002-2006)
 Andy Pandy (2002-20??)
 Andy's Wild Adventures
 Animal Stories
 The Animals of Farthing Wood (2001-2002)
 Atomic Betty (2011-2018)
 Balamory (2004-2011)
 Bananas in Pyjamas (2001-2009)
 Barney
 The Basil Brush Show (2003-2008)
 Be the Creature
 Bear Behaving Badly (2008-2011)
 Beauty and the Geek
 The Beeps
 Being Ian
 Belfry Witches (2001-2003)
 Bernard
 The Best (2008-2009)
 Best in Australia (2009-2011)
 Big Babies
 Big Bear and Squeak
 The Big Knights
 Big Wolf on Campus
 Bill and Ben (2001-2005)
 Binka (2001-2011)
 Bits and Bobs
 Blackadder (2004-20??)
 Blazing Dragons
 Blue Peter
 Boj (2015-2018)
 Boogie Beebies (2007-2010)
 Brady's Beasts
 Brat Camp
 Buzz and Tell
 Byker Grove
 Caitlin's Way
 The Call
 Canimals
 Cavegirl (2003-2004)
 Celeb
 CG Kids
 Changing Rooms
 Charlie and Lola
 Chorlton and the Wheelies
 Clangers
 Creature Comforts
 Creepy Crawlies
 Crocadoo
 Custer's Last Stand-up
 The Cuties
 D'Myna Leagues
 Dance Academy
 Dawson's Creek (2010-2011)
 Dead Gorgeous
 Deadly 360
 Deadly 60
 Deadly Mission Madagascar
 Deadly Nightmares of Nature
 Deadly Pole to Pole
 Deadly Top 10
 Degrassi High
 Degrassi Junior High
 Digby Dragon (2016-2018)
 Dinosapien (2007-2010)
 Dinosaur Detectives (2001-2007)
 DIY TV
 Doctor Who
 Dogs with Jobs
 Don't Blame the Koalas (2004-20??)
 Doodlez
 Eckhart
 Ed and Oucho's Excellent Inventions
 Emily of New Moon
 Emma
 Escape from Scorpion Island
 Eureka TV
 Extreme Animals
 Fabeltjeskrant (2013-2018)
 Factomania
 The Famous Jett Jackson (2004-2010)
 Fierce Earth
 FightBox (2004-2005)
 Fimbles
 Florrie's Dragons (2011-2016)
 Fraggle Rock (2006-2009)
 Freefonix (2009-2011)
 French and Saunders
 Garth and Bev (2011-2014)
 Gawayn
 Gazoon
 The Gees
 The Genie from Down Under
 Girls in Love
 Gjaney Verde
 The Graham Norton Show (2008-2011)
 Grange Hill
 Groove High
 Hairy Jeremy
 Hank Zipzer
 Harry and Toto
 Hey Duggee
 The Hive
 Hollyoaks
 Home Farm Twins
 Home on Their Own
 Horrible Histories (2011-2018)
 Horrible Science
 Humf
 Hyperdrive
 I Am Not an Animal
 I Can Cook (2011-2012)
 I Was a Sixth Grade Alien (2007-2009)
 Igam Ogam
 In the Night Garden 
 In a Heartbeat
 Inspector Gadget (2017-2018)
 Inside Life
 It'll Never Work?
 Ivick von Salza
 Jamie's School Dinners (2008-2009)
 Jeopardy (2002-20??)
 Joan of Arcadia
 Joe and Jack (2012-2015)
 The Jungle Bunch
 Just One Bite
 K-9 (2012-2013)
 Kate & Mim-Mim (2014-2018)
 Kerwhizz (2011-2016)
 KidsWorld Sports
 King Arthur's Disasters
 The Klumpies
 The Koala Brothers
 Kratts' Creatures (2011-2012)
 Lah-Lah’s Adventures (2014-2018)
 The Large Family (2014-2018)
 Lark Rise to Candleford
 The Legend of Dick and Dom
 Leon
 Leonardo
 The Life of Birds
 The Life of Mammals (2011-2014)
 Lightning Point
 Lilly the Witch
 Little Britain
 Little Princess
 Lockie Leonard
 Lunar Jim (2006-2013)
 M.I. High
 Madison
 The Magic School Bus (2001-2002)
 The Magician's House
 Maid Marian and Her Merry Men (2001-2007)
 The Make Shift
 Me and My Monsters
 Miami 7 (2004-2011)
 The Mystery Files
 The Mighty Boosh
 Mighty Machines
 Minuscule
 Missy Milly
 Mister Maker
 Mofy
 Molang
 Moone Boy
 Monty
 Mortified
 Mr. Bean
 Mr. Bean: The Animated Series
 My Hero
 My Parents Are Aliens
 Naked Chef (2007-2010)
 Natural Born Hunters
 Naturally, Sadie
 Nelly and Nora
 The New Adventures of Figaro Pho
 Nico Can Dance (2015-2018)
 Nina and the Neurons
 No Sweat
 Numberjacks
 Nuzzle and Scratch (2011-2014)
 Oddbods
 Officially Amazing
 Olive the Ostrich
 Oliver's Twist (2008-2009)
 Olliver's Adventures
 Our Hero
 Out There
 Paddington
 The Paradise
 Party Mamas
 Penny Crayon
 Pingu
 Pipsqueak's Planet
 Planet Earth (2011-2018)
 Postman Pat (2004-2009)
 Popular Mechanics for Kids
 Powers (2004-20??)
 The Queen's Nose (2001-2007)
 Radio Free Roscoe
 Rank the Prank
 Rastamouse (2012-2018)
 Raven (2004-2014)
 Ready Jet Go! (2016-2018)
 Ready or Not
 The Really Wild Show
 Red Dwarf
 Reel Late Movies
 Robin Hood
 Robin Hood: Mischief in Sherwood
 The Roly Mo Show (2008-2011)
 Rooms that Rock
 Rotten Ralph
 Roy
 The Saddle Club
 Sadie J
 The Sarah Jane Adventures
 The Secret Adventures of Jules Verne
 The Secret Show
 Serious
 Shaun the Sheep (2011-2018)
 Shoebox Zoo (2006-2011)
 Show Me Show Me (2011-2012)
 Silverwing
 The Sleepover Club
 Smack the Pony
 The Sorcerer's Apprentice
 Sorry I've Got No Head
 Spider!
 Spot Bots
 Stacey Stone
 Stig of the Dump
 Stitch Up!
 The Strangerers
 Stuff (2001-2006)
 Sumo Mouse (2010-2011)
 Surprise! It's Edible Incredible!
 Tales of the Riverbank
 Tarzan
 Theodore Tugboat
 Thunderbirds
 Timmy Time
 Top of the Pops
 Tots TV
 Trapped!
 Tree Fu Tom
 Trigger Happy TV
 The Tumblies
 Tweenies (2001-2008)
 Two Pints of Lager and a Packet of Crisps
 The Vicar of Dibley
 Victor & Maria
 Viva S Club (2004-2011)
 Walk on the Wild Side
 The Weakest Link
 What Not to Wear
 Who Let the Dogs Out?
 Who Wants to Be a Superhero?
 Wild and Weird
 William's Wish Wellingtons
 Woolly and Tig (2013-2014)
 The Wonder Years (2008-2009)
 The Worst Witch
 Yakkity Yak
 Yam Roll
 Yoho Ahoy
 Yoko
 Young Dracula
 The Young Ones
 Zoo Diaries (2005-2008)
 Zoobabu

CBeebies
 3rd & Bird (2013-2017)
 Baby Jake (2014-2016)
 Bob the Builder (2012-2017)
 Fireman Sam (Series 1-5 only) (2014-2018)
 George Shrinks (2016-2018)
 Go Jetters (2015-2017)
 Little Robots (2004-2018)
 Lunar Jim (2006-2013)
 Mr Bloom's Nursery (2015-2017)
 ZingZillas (2011-2012)

The Spot
 Are You Afraid of the Dark? (2006-2010)
 Arthur (2006-2011)
 Big Cook, Little Cook (2009-2011)
 The Big Knights (2003-2011)

BBCK

 Bits and Bobs (2003-2010)
 Captain Abercromby (2004-2005)
 Connie the Cow (2001-2004)
 Doctor Who (2001-2010)
 Dude, That's My Ghost (2013-2017)
 Fimbles (2003-2010)
 Jar Dwellers SOS (2014-2017)
 Jacob Two-Two (2013-2016)
 Mona the Vampire (2012-2017)
 Noonbory and the Super Seven (2009-2010)
 Polka Dot Shorts (2001-2005)
 Prank Patrol (2014-2017)
 Ricky Sprocket Showbiz Boy (2013-2017)
 Roboroach (2013-2017)
 Round the Twist (2004-2007)
 Space Cases (2001-2004)
 Teletubbies (2001-2009)
 Theodore Tugboat (2005-2009)
 Thomas & Friends (2001-2009)
 What About Mimi? (2012-2016)
 The Wombles (2001-2005)
 Zoboomafoo (2007-2010)

Programming blocks
 CBeebies – The network's preschool block, debuted after the transition of control to Knowledge and airing in the morning; similar to the BBC original.
 Cartoon Afternoons – The channel's afternoon block of animation.
 Drama at 8 – A primetime block featuring family sitcoms and dramas.

 BBCK – A block which aired from April 3, 2006 until the Knowledge transfer in the overnight period, focusing on programming for older teenagers, purposefully scheduled to appear as its own network a la the American Nick at Nite with its own website and continuity separate from BBC Kids.
 The Spot – Aired from the network's debut until the Knowledge transfer as the network's block for pre-teen audiences from noontime until the start of BBCK on weekdays and in the mornings on weekends.

References

English-language television stations in Canada
Digital cable television networks in Canada
Children's television networks in Canada
Mass media in Burnaby
Defunct television networks in Canada
International BBC television channels
Television channels and stations established in 2001
Television channels and stations disestablished in 2018
2001 establishments in Canada
2018 disestablishments in Canada
Former Corus Entertainment subsidiaries
BBC Worldwide
Former Corus Entertainment networks
Defunct BBC television channels